Camissonia strigulosa is a species of flowering plant in the evening primrose family known by the common name sandysoil suncup.

The plant is native to California and Baja California, where it grows in sandy areas, such as beaches, mountain sandbars, and the Mojave Desert.

Description
Camissonia strigulosa is an annual herb with a tough, slender, hairy stem which may grow erect or lie along the sand. It approaches 50 centimeters in maximum length and is lined with small, thin green to red linear leaves with tiny bumpy teeth along the edges.

The flower has four yellow petals a few millimeters long which may have red spots near the bases.

The fruit is a long, very thin podlike capsule containing tiny seeds.

References

External links

Jepson Manual Treatment
Photo gallery

strigulosa
Flora of Baja California
Flora of California
Flora of the Sierra Nevada (United States)
Flora of the California desert regions
Natural history of the California chaparral and woodlands
Natural history of the California Coast Ranges
Natural history of the Channel Islands of California
Natural history of the Mojave Desert
Natural history of the Peninsular Ranges
Natural history of the San Francisco Bay Area
Natural history of the Santa Monica Mountains
Natural history of the Transverse Ranges